Xonotlite, or eakleite, is a mineral of general formula  named by the German mineralogist Karl Friedrich August Rammelsberg in 1866. The name originates from its discovery locality, Tetela de Xonotla, Puebla, Mexico. Although it was discovered in 1866, it was first described in 1959. It is approved by the IMA, but it is a grandfathered species, meaning the name supposedly represents a valid species til this day.

Properties 
Xonotlite is an ino-silicate with double dreier chains, of which several polytypes are known. The known polytypes are Ma2bc, Ma2b2c and M2a2bc. It is a mineral related to the tobermorite group. It can be colorless, gray, light gray, lemon white, or pink. It is transparent with a vitreous to silky luster. It leaves a white streak. Xonotlite is rated 6.5 on the Mohs scale of hardness. It crystallizes in the monoclinic - prismatic crystal system, with typically an acicular crystal form or habit, meaning it occurs as needle-like crystals. It is massive, meaning individual crystals are hard to tell apart as they form large masses. It mainly consists of oxygen (42.52%), calcium (33.63%) and silicon (23.57%), and includes hydrogen (0.28%). It is a luminescent mineral, under short ultraviolet light it has a weak gray-white fluorescence, and under long UV it is weak white. It isn't a magnetic mineral, and is not radioactive.

Environment and mining 

It occurs as veins in serpentinite and contact metamorphism aureoles. Associated minerals include apophyllite, diopside, stilbite, tobermorite, clinohedrite, thaumasite, laumontite and wollastonite. The most common impurities include iron, magnesium and carbon dioxyde impurities. It has many type localities, the most notable one being Tetela de Ocampo, Mexico.

See also

References

Further reading

External links 

 Webmineral data
 Mineral Data Publishing
 Mindat with location data

Calcium minerals
Inosilicates
Monoclinic minerals
Minerals in space group 13